Middle River Township is a township in Marshall County, Minnesota, United States. The population was 102 at the 2000 census.

Middle River Township was organized in 1879, and named after the Middle River.

Geography
According to the United States Census Bureau, the township has a total area of 34.8 square miles (90.2 km2), all land.

Demographics
As of the census of 2000, there were 102 people, 40 households, and 33 families residing in the township. The population density was 2.9 people per square mile (1.1/km2). There were 42 housing units at an average density of 1.2/sq mi (0.5/km2). The racial makeup of the township was 96.08% White, 3.92% from other races. Hispanic or Latino of any race were 3.92% of the population.

There were 40 households, out of which 27.5% had children under the age of 18 living with them, 70.0% were married couples living together, 2.5% had a female householder with no husband present, and 17.5% were non-families. 17.5% of all households were made up of individuals, and 5.0% had someone living alone who was 65 years of age or older. The average household size was 2.55 and the average family size was 2.73.

In the township the population was spread out, with 23.5% under the age of 18, 1.0% from 18 to 24, 28.4% from 25 to 44, 27.5% from 45 to 64, and 19.6% who were 65 years of age or older. The median age was 44 years. For every 100 females, there were 112.5 males. For every 100 females age 18 and over, there were 116.7 males.

The median income for a household in the township was $37,500, and the median income for a family was $40,000. Males had a median income of $17,250 versus $18,500 for females. The per capita income for the township was $16,793. There were 7.1% of families and 7.3% of the population living below the poverty line, including 12.5% of under eighteens and none of those over 64.

References

Townships in Marshall County, Minnesota
Townships in Minnesota